Yueyanglou District is one of three urban districts in Yueyang City, Hunan province, China; it is also the 3rd most populous district (after Heshan and Dingcheng Districts) in the province. The district is located in the middle part of the city proper of Yueyang, it is on the lake of Dongting's southeastern side, the lake  flows into Yangtze in the north western outer margin of the district. The district is bordered by Jianli County of Hubei and Junshan District to the north,  surrounded by Yueyang County to the west, the south and the southeast, Yunxi District to the northeast. The district has 17 subdistricts, a town and two townships under its jurisdiction. the government seat is Wulipai.

Yueyanglou District is named after the Tower of Yueyang, the tower has a history of nearly 1800 years and it was built in the period of Three Kingdoms. the Yueyang Tower is also one of Chinese AAAAA-rated tourist attractions.

Administrative divisions
According to the result on adjustment of township-level administrative divisions of Yueyanglou District on November 30, 2015, Yueyanglou has two townships and one town and 17 subdistricts under its jurisdiction, they are:

2 townships
 Guozhen
 Kangwang

1 town
 Xitang, Yueyang

17 subdistricts
 Chenglingji
 Dongmaoling
 Dongting, Yueyang
 Fengshuhu
 Hubin, Yueyang
 Jin'eshan
 Luowang, Yueyang
 Lüxianting
 Nanhu, Yueyang
 Qijialing
 Qiusuo
 Sanyanqiao
 Wangjiahe
 Wangyuelu
 Wulipai, Yueyang
 Yueyanglou Subdistrict
 Zhanqianlu

References

www.xzqh.org 

 
County-level divisions of Hunan
Yueyang